Mary Kristina Pickering (born October 7, 1952 in San Francisco, California) is a justice of the Nevada Supreme Court. She became the fifth woman to serve on the Court when she was sworn in on January 5, 2009. She received a Bachelor of Arts at Yale University, and her Juris Doctor from the University of California, Davis School of Law. She became Chief Justice on January 6, 2020. She previously served as chief justice in 2013.

References

|-

|-

1952 births
21st-century American judges
21st-century American women judges
Chief Justices of the Nevada Supreme Court
Georgetown University alumni
Living people
Justices of the Nevada Supreme Court
People from San Francisco
UC Davis School of Law alumni
Women chief justices of state supreme courts in the United States
Yale University alumni